AD 67 (LXVII) was a common year starting on Thursday (link will display the full calendar) of the Julian calendar. At the time it was known as the Year of the Consulship of Julius Rufus and Fonteius Capito (or, less frequently, year 820 Ab urbe condita). The denomination AD 67 for this year has been used since the early medieval period, when the Anno Domini calendar era became the prevalent method in Europe for naming years.

Events

By place

Roman Empire 
 Vindex revolts, first in a series of revolts that lead to Nero's downfall.
 Gaius Licinius Mucianus replaces Cestius Gallus as governor of Syria.
 Jewish Revolt: Vespasian arrives in Ptolemais, along with Legio X Fretensis and Legio V Macedonica, to put down the revolt.
 Vespasian is joined by his son Titus, who brings Legio XV Apollinaris from Alexandria. By late spring the Roman army numbers more than 60,000 soldiers, including auxiliaries and troops of King Agrippa II. 
 Jewish leaders at Jerusalem are divided through a power struggle, and a brutal civil war erupts. The Zealots and the Sicarii execute anyone who tries to leave the city.  
 Siege of Jotapata: Its 40,000 Jewish inhabitants are massacred. The historian Josephus, leader of the rebels in Galilee, is captured by the Romans. Vespasian is wounded in the foot by an arrow fired from the city wall. 
 The Jewish fortress of Gamla in the Golan falls to the Romans, and its inhabitants are massacred.
 Nero travels to Greece, where he participates in the Olympic Games and other festivals.
 Nero, jealous of the success of Gnaeus Domitius Corbulo in Armenia, orders that he be put to death. Corbulo literally "falls on his sword".

By topic

Religion 
 Apostles Peter and Paul are martyred in Rome.
 Linus succeeds Peter, as the second Bishop of Rome.
<onlyinclude>

Births 
 Myeongnim Dap-bu, Korean prime minister (d. 179)
 Publius Juventius Celsus, Roman consul (d. 130)

Deaths 
 Cestius Gallus, Roman politician and governor 
 Gnaeus Domitius Corbulo, Roman general (b. c. AD 7)
 Lucius Domitius Paris, Roman freedman and actor
 Paul the Apostle, Christian martyr (b. c. AD 5)
 Paulinus of Antioch, Roman bishop and martyr
 Publius Rufus Anteius, Roman politician
 Publius Sulpicius Scribonius, Roman politician

References 

0067